The Great Stone Face is:

 a nickname of Buster Keaton
 a nickname of Keanu Reeves
 a nickname of Ed Sullivan
 a nickname for the Old Man of the Mountain, a New Hampshire rock formation that collapsed in 2003
 a short story by Nathaniel Hawthorne published in The Snow-Image, and Other Twice-Told Tales
 a rock formation in Millard County, Utah, purported to look like the profile of Joseph Smith.

See also
 Stoneface (disambiguation)

Nicknames in film